{{Automatic taxobox
| fossil_range = 
| image = Secretary_Leonard_Carmichael.jpg
| image_caption = Three hominines - an adult human (Leonard Carmichael) holding a young gorilla and a young chimpanzee.
| taxon = Homininae
| authority = Gray, 1825
| type_species = Homo sapiens
| type_species_authority = Linnaeus, 1758
| subdivision_ranks = Tribes
| subdivision = * †Dryopithecini
 Gorillini Hominini
}}

Homininae, also called "African hominids" or "African apes", is a subfamily of Hominidae. It includes two tribes, with their extant as well as extinct species: 1) the tribe Hominini (with the genus Homo including modern humans and numerous extinct species; the subtribe Hominina, comprising at least two extinct genera; and the subtribe Panina, represented only by the genus Pan, which includes chimpanzees and bonobos)―and 2) the tribe Gorillini (gorillas). Alternatively, the genus Pan is sometimes considered to belong to its own third tribe, Panini. Homininae comprises all hominids that arose after orangutans (subfamily Ponginae) split from the line of great apes. The Homininae cladogram has three main branches, which lead to gorillas (through the tribe Gorillini), and to humans and chimpanzees via the tribe Hominini and subtribes Hominina and Panina (see the evolutionary tree below). There are two living species of Panina (chimpanzees and bonobos) and two living species of gorillas, but only one extant human species. Traces of extinct Homo species, including Homo floresiensis have been found with dates as recent as 40,000 years ago. Organisms in this subfamily are described as hominine or hominines (not to be confused with the terms hominins or hominini).

History of discoveries and classification

Until 1970, the family (and term) Hominidae meant humans only; the non-human great apes were assigned to the family Pongidae. Later discoveries led to revised classifications, with the great apes then united with humans (now in subfamily Homininae) as members of family Hominidae  
By 1990, it was recognized that gorillas and chimpanzees are more closely related to humans than they are to orangutans, leading to their (gorillas' and chimpanzees') placement in subfamily Homininae as well.

The subfamily Homininae can be further subdivided into three branches: the tribe Gorillini (gorillas), the tribe Hominini with subtribes Panina (chimpanzees) and Hominina (humans and their extinct relatives), and the extinct tribe Dryopithecini. The Late Miocene fossil Nakalipithecus nakayamai, described in 2007, is a basal member of this clade, as is, perhaps, its contemporary Ouranopithecus; that is, they are not assignable to any of the three extant branches. Their existence suggests that the Homininae tribes diverged not earlier than about 8 million years ago (see Human evolutionary genetics).

Today, chimpanzees and gorillas live in tropical forests with acid soils that rarely preserve fossils. Although no fossil gorillas have been reported, four chimpanzee teeth about 500,000 years old have been discovered in the East-African rift valley (Kapthurin Formation, Kenya), where many fossils from the human lineage (hominins) have been found. This shows that some chimpanzees lived close to Homo (H. erectus or H. rhodesiensis) at the time; the same is likely true for gorillas.

Taxonomic classification

Homininae
 Tribe Dryopithecini†
 Kenyapithecus Kenyapitheus wickeri Ouranopithecus Ouranopithecus macedoniensis Otavipithecus Otavipithecus namibiensis Morotopithecus Morotopithecus bishopi Oreopithecus 
 Oreopithecus bambolii Nakalipithecus Nakalipithecus nakayamai Anoiapithecus Anoiapithecus brevirostris Dryopithecus 
 Dryopithecus wuduensis Dryopithecus fontani Hispanopithecus 
 Hispanopithecus laietanus Hispanopithecus crusafonti Neopithecus 
 Neopithecus brancoi Pierolapithecus Pierolapithecus catalaunicus Rudapithecus Rudapithecus hungaricus Samburupithecus Samburupithecus kiptalami Udabnopithecus Udabnopithecus garedziensis Danuvius Danuvius guggenmosi Tribe Gorillini
 Chororapithecus †
 Chororapithecus abyssinicus Genus Gorilla Western gorilla, Gorilla gorilla Western lowland gorilla, Gorilla gorilla gorilla Cross River gorilla, Gorilla gorilla diehli Eastern gorilla, Gorilla beringei Mountain gorilla, Gorilla beringei beringei Eastern lowland gorilla, Gorilla beringei graueri Tribe Hominini
 Subtribe Panina
 Genus Pan Chimpanzee (common chimpanzee), Pan troglodytes Central chimpanzee, Pan troglodytes troglodytes Western chimpanzee, Pan troglodytes verus Nigeria-Cameroon chimpanzee, Pan troglodytes ellioti Eastern chimpanzee, Pan troglodytes schweinfurthii Bonobo (pygmy chimpanzee), Pan paniscus Subtribe Hominina
 Graecopithecus †
 Graecopithecus freybergi. Note: Graecopithecus has also been subsumed by other authors into Dryopithecus. The placement of Graecopithecus within the Hominina, as shown here, represents a hypothesis, but not scientific consensus.
 Sahelanthropus†
 Sahelanthropus tchadensis Orrorin†
 Orrorin tugenensis Ardipithecus†
 Ardipithecus ramidus Ardipithecus kadabba Kenyanthropus†
 Kenyanthropus platyops Praeanthropus†
 Praeanthropus bahrelghazali (Australopithecus bahrelghazali) Praeanthropus anamensis (Australopithecus anamensis) Praeanthropus afarensis (Australopithecus afarensis) Australopithecus†
 Australopithecus africanus Australopithecus garhi Australopithecus sediba Paranthropus†
 Paranthropus aethiopicus Paranthropus robustus Paranthropus boisei Homo – immediate ancestors of modern humans
 Homo gautengensis†
 Homo rudolfensis†
 Homo habilis†
 Homo floresiensis†
 Homo erectus†
 Homo ergaster†
 Homo antecessor†
 Homo heidelbergensis†
 Homo cepranensis†
 Denisovans (scientific name has not yet been assigned)†
 Homo neanderthalensis†
 Homo rhodesiensis†
 Homo sapiens Anatomically modern human, Homo sapiens sapiens Archaic Homo sapiens (Cro-magnon)†
 Red Deer Cave people† (scientific name has not yet been assigned)
 Homo sapiens idaltu†

Evolution

The age of the subfamily Homininae (of the Homininae–Ponginae last common ancestor) is estimated at some 14 to 12.5 million years (Sivapithecus). 

There is evidence there was interbreeding of Gorillas and the Pan–Homo ancestors until right up to the Pan–Homo split.

Evolution of bipedalism

Recent studies of Ardipithecus ramidus (4.4 million years old) and Orrorin tugenensis (6 million years old) suggest some degree of bipedalism. Australopithecus and early Paranthropus may have been bipedal. Very early hominins such as Ardipithecus ramidus may have possessed an arboreal type of bipedalism.

The evolution of bipedalism encouraged multiple changes among hominins especially when it came to bipedalism in humans as they were now able to do many other things as they began to walk with their feet. These changes included the ability to now use their hands to create tools or carry things with their hands, the ability to travel longer distances at a faster speed, and the ability to hunt for food. According to researchers, humans were able to be bipedalists due to Darwin’s Principle of natural selection.

The first every theory that introduced the origins of bipedalism was the Savannah hypothesis (Dart 1925.) This theory hypothesized that hominins became bipedalists due to the environment of the Savanna such as the tall grass and dry climate. This was later proven to be incorrect due to fossil records that showed that hominins were still climbing trees during this era.

The most recent and most accurate theory is the provisioning model that was established by Owen Lovejoy. He suggested that bipedalism was a result of sexual dimorphism in efforts to help with the collecting of food and to help women to be able to care for their offspring better as they can now use their hands to hold them. In this model men were the providers leaving their responsibilities to be protectors and providers of food and shelter. On the other hand, women were the care takers and had the responsibility to nourish, groom and care for their children.

Further information supporting the evolution of bipedalism includes an article written by Haile-Selassie on the impact of Australopithecus anamensis in human evolution which goes into detail discussing how A. anamensis which is in the subfamily Homininae were one of the first hominins to evolve into obligate bipedalists. The remains of this subfamily are very important in the field of research as it presents possible information regarding how these primates adapted from tree life to terrestrial life. This was a huge adaptation as it encouraged many evolutionary changes within humans including the ability to use their hand to make tools and gather food, as well as a larger brain development due to their change in diet.

Brain size evolution

There has been a gradual increase in brain volume (brain size) as the ancestors of modern humans progressed along the timeline of human evolution, starting from about 600 cm3 in Homo habilis up to 1500 cm3 in Homo neanderthalensis. However, modern Homo sapiens have a brain volume slightly smaller (1250 cm3) than Neanderthals, women have a brain slightly smaller than men and the Flores hominids (Homo floresiensis), nicknamed hobbits, had a cranial capacity of about 380 cm3 (considered small for a chimpanzee), about a third of the Homo erectus average. It is proposed that they evolved from H. erectus as a case of insular dwarfism. In spite of their smaller brain, there is evidence that H. floresiensis used fire and made stone tools at least as sophisticated as those of their proposed ancestors H. erectus. In this case, it seems that for intelligence, the structure of the brain is more important than its size.

The current size of the human brain is a big distinguishing factor that separates humans from other primates. Recent examination of the human brain shows that the brain of a human is about more than four times the size of great apes and 20 times larger than the brain size of old world monkeys. A study was conducted to help determine the evolution of the brain size within the sub family Homininae that tested the genes ASPM (abnormal spindle-like microcephaly associated) and MCHP1 (microcephalin-1) and their association with the human brain. In this study researchers discovered that the increase in brain size is correlated to the increase of both ASP and MCPH1. MCPH1 is very polymorphic in humans compared to gibbons, Old World monkeys. This gene helps encourage the growth of the brain. Further research indicated that the MCPH1 gene in humans could have also been an encouraging factor of population expansion. Other researchers have included that the diet was an encouraging factor to brain size as protein intake increased this helped brain development.

Evolution of family structure and sexuality

Sexuality is related to family structure and partly shapes it. The involvement of fathers in education is quite unique to humans, at least when compared to other Homininae. Concealed ovulation and menopause in women both also occur in a few other primates however, but are uncommon in other species. Testis and penis size seems to be related to family structure: monogamy or promiscuity, or harem, in humans, chimpanzees or gorillas, respectively. The levels of sexual dimorphism are generally seen as a marker of sexual selection. Studies have suggested that the earliest hominins were dimorphic and that this lessened over the course of the evolution of the genus Homo, correlating with humans becoming more monogamous, whereas gorillas, who live in harems, show a large degree of sexual dimorphism. Concealed (or "hidden") ovulation means that the phase of fertility is not detectable in women, whereas chimpanzees advertise ovulation via an obvious swelling of the genitals. Women can be partly aware of their ovulation along the menstrual phases, but men are essentially unable to detect ovulation in women. Most primates have semi-concealed ovulation, thus one can think that the common ancestor had semi-concealed ovulation, that was inherited by gorillas, and that later evolved in concealed ovulation in humans and advertised ovulation in chimpanzees. Menopause also occurs in rhesus monkeys, and possibly in chimpanzees, but does not in gorillas and is quite uncommon in other primates (and other mammal groups).

 See also 
 Chimpanzee–human last common ancestor
 Gorilla–human last common ancestor
 Orangutan–human last common ancestor
 Gibbon–human last common ancestor
 List of human evolution fossils

Notes

Citations

http://www.bas.bg/en/2019/11/07/remains-of-a-new-hominid-from-germany-more-than-11-5-million-years-old-change-our-views-on-the-evolution-of-great-apes-and-humans/

 References 
Andrews, P., & Harrison, T. (2005). "7 The Last Common Ancestor of Apes and Humans". In Interpreting the Past. Leiden, The Netherlands: Brill. doi: https://doi.org/10.1163/9789047416616_013

Goodman, Morris, et al. “Primate Evolution at the DNA Level and a Classification of Hominoids - Journal of Molecular Evolution.” SpringerLink, Springer-Verlag, https://link.springer.com/article/10.1007/BF02099995.

Ko, Kwang HyunOrigins of Bipedalism. Brazilian Archives of Biology and Technology [online]. 2015, v. 58, n. 6 [Accessed 2 March 2022] , pp. 929-934. Available from: <https://doi.org/10.1590/S1516-89132015060399>. Epub Nov-Dec 2015. ISSN 1678-4324. https://doi.org/10.1590/S1516-89132015060399.

Leyva-Hernández, S. ., Fong-Zazueta, R. ., Medrano-González, L. ., & Aguirre-Samudio, A. J. . (2021). The evolution of brain size among the Homininae and selection at ASPM and MCPH1 genes . Biosis: Biological Systems, 2(2), 293-310. https://doi.org/10.37819/biosis.002.02.0104

Yin-qiu Wang, Bing Su, Molecular evolution of microcephalin, a gene determining human brain size, Human Molecular Genetics'', Volume 13, Issue 11, 1 June 2004, Pages 1131–1137, https://doi.org/10.1093/hmg/ddh127

Haile-Selassie. (2021). From trees to the ground: the significance of Australopithecus anamensis in human evolution. Journal of Anthropological Research., 77(4), 457–482.

External links 

 Human Timeline (Interactive) – Smithsonian, National Museum of Natural History (August 2016).

 
Apes
Extant Miocene first appearances
Mammal subfamilies
Taxa named by John Edward Gray
Taxa described in 1825